Aabed-El ben Asher ben Matzliach (Samaritan Hebrew:  ʾĀbədʾēl ban ʾĀ̊šər ban Maṣlīyaʾ; born 1935 in Nablus, is the current Samaritan High Priest. He assumed office on April 19, 2013. According to Samaritan tradition, he is the 133rd high priest since Aaron and in accordance with Samaritan custom, upon his death, the office automatically transfers to the oldest surviving descendant of Ithamar. Aabed-El is married and has two sons and two daughters.

A successful business man, Aabed-El is the grandson of Matzliach ben Phinhas ben Yitzhaq ben Shalma, who was Samaritan high priest from 1933 to 1943.

References 

Living people
1935 births

Samaritan high priests
People from Nablus
Samaritans